Panenské Břežany is a municipality and village in Prague-East District in the Central Bohemian Region of the Czech Republic. It has about 600 inhabitants.

Geography
The western part of the municipality is located in the Prague Plateau, the eastern part is located in the Central Elbe Table.

History

The settlement was first mentioned in 1233 as the possession of the Benedictine St. George's Convent at Prague Castle. The first mention of a keep in Panenské Břežany is from 1441. In the first half of the 18th century a Baroque palace was built, which came to be called the Horní Chateau ("Upper Chateau").

After the secularization of the monastery during reign of Emperor Joseph II the manor fell to the Virgin Teinitz Religious foundation. Until 1828 the owners changed several times, then it was purchased by Matthias von Riese-Stallburg. Around 1840 he built the Dolní Chateau ("Lower Chateau"). His descendants lost the property in 1901 because of indebtedness to the Prague Credit Bank. In 1909 the property was bought by Ferdinand Bloch-Bauer, a financially strong Jewish buyer involved in the sugar industry.

Following the Nazi occupation after 1939, the Jewish industrialist fled and the estate was confiscated. From 1939 to 1942 the Lower Chateau was the residence of the Reichsprotektor of Bohemia and Moravia. In the chateau complex lived both Konstantin von Neurath and from 1941 his deputy (Stellvertretender Reichsprotektor), the SS-Obergruppenführer Reinhard Heydrich, with their families.

In May 1942, while driving from the mansion to his work in Prague, Heydrich died as a result of an assassination attempt. After Heydrich's death, his widow Lina lived with the children at the chateau until 1945. Their ten-year-old son Klaus died in a car accident there in October 1943.

The Horní Chateau was occupied by Karl Hermann Frank during World War II.

"In April 1943 Hitler finally decided that the future of the [Heydrich] family must be safeguarded, and by a special Fuehrer-decret he ordered that Heydrich's "beloved schloss Jungfern-Breschan" with all its contents and lands should be handed over to his widow and family in perpetuity. The Fuehrer added that it was his desire that the heirs should always be associated with the property."

References

External links

Villages in Prague-East District